Michael "Mike" Eugene Green (born November 5, 1973) is an American politician and a former Democratic member of the West Virginia Senate representing District 9 from 2006 to 2014.

Education
Green attended Concord University, Mountain State University (since closed), and the West Virginia State Police Academy.

Elections
2010 Green was unopposed for the May 11, 2010 Democratic Primary, winning with 5,774 votes, and won the November 2, 2010 General election with 14,757 votes (57.7%) against Republican nominee James Mullins.
2006 To challenge District 9 incumbent Republican Senator Russ Weeks, Green won the three-way 2006 Democratic Primary against Delegate Sally Susman and former state senator Bill Wooton and won the November 7, 2006 General election against Senator Weeks.

References

External links
Official page at the West Virginia Legislature

Mike Green at Ballotpedia
Mike Green at the National Institute on Money in State Politics

1973 births
Concord University alumni
Living people
People from Raleigh County, West Virginia
Place of birth missing (living people)
Democratic Party West Virginia state senators
21st-century American politicians
Mountain State University alumni